The Bacterophase Dp-1 Holin (Dp-1 Holin) Family (TC# 1.E.24) is a family of proteins present in several Gram-positive bacteria (i.e., Enterococcus faecalis) and their phage. The genes coding for the lytic system of the pneumococcal phage, Dp-1, has been cloned and characterized. The holin of phage Dp-1 is 74 amino acyl residues (aas) long with two putative transmembrane segments (TMSs) (residues 12-32 and 39-57). The lytic enzyme of Dp-1 (Pal), an N-acetyl-muramoyl-L-alanine amidase, shows a modular organization similar to that described for the lytic enzymes of Streptococcus pneumoniae and its bacteriophage in which change in the order of the functional domains changes the enzyme specificity. A representative list of proteins belonging to the Dp-1 family can be found in the Transporter Classification Database.

See also 
 Holin
 Lysin
 Transporter Classification Database

References 

Protein families
Membrane proteins
Transmembrane proteins
Transmembrane transporters
Transport proteins
Integral membrane proteins
Holins